Diastatomma bicolor is a species of dragonfly in the family Gomphidae. It is found in Angola, Cameroon, the Democratic Republic of the Congo, Equatorial Guinea, Guinea, Togo, Uganda, and Zambia. Its natural habitats are subtropical or tropical moist lowland forests and rivers.

References

Gomphidae
Insects described in 1869
Taxa named by Edmond de Sélys Longchamps
Taxonomy articles created by Polbot